The 2015 NCAA Division I Indoor Track and Field Championships was the 51st NCAA Men's Division I Indoor Track and Field Championships and the 34th NCAA Women's Division I Indoor Track and Field Championships, held at the Randal Tyson Track Center in Fayetteville, Arkansas near the campus of the host school, the University of Arkansas. In total, thirty-two different men's and women's indoor track and field events were contested from March 13 to March 14, 2015.

Results

Men's results

60 meters
Final results shown, not prelims

60-m hurdles
Final results shown, not prelims

200 meters
Final results shown, not prelims

400 meters
Final results shown, not prelims

800 meters
Final results shown, not prelims

Mile
Final results shown, not prelims

3000 meters
Final results shown, not prelims. Only top ten results shown

5000 meters
Final results shown, not prelims. Only top ten results shown

Distance Medley Relay
Leg 1 is 1200 meters, Leg 2 is 400 meters, Leg 3 is 800 meters, and Leg 4 is 1600 meters. Only top three final results shown

Women's results

60 meters
Final results shown, not prelims

60-m hurdles
Final results shown, not prelims

200 meters
Final results shown, not prelims

400 meters
Final results shown, not prelims

800 meters
Final results shown, not prelims

Mile
Final results shown, not prelims

3000 meters
Final results shown, not prelims. Only top ten results shown

5000 meters
Final results shown, not prelims. Only top ten results shown

Distance Medley Relay
Leg 1 is 1200 meters, Leg 2 is 400 meters, Leg 3 is 800 meters, and Leg 4 is 1600 meters. Only top three final results shown

See also
 NCAA Men's Division I Indoor Track and Field Championships 
 NCAA Women's Division I Indoor Track and Field Championships

References
 

NCAA Indoor Track and Field Championships
NCAA Division I Indoor Track and Field Championships
NCAA Division I Indoor Track and Field Championships
NCAA Division I Indoor Track and Field Championships
NCAA Division I Indoor Track and Field Championships